Adam Kownacki (born 27 March 1989) is a Polish professional boxer.

Early life
Kownacki was born in Łomża, Poland. When he was 7 years old, he emigrated to Greenpoint, Brooklyn in 1996 along with his parents and brothers, settling into the large Polish community there. As a youngster, he played a variety of sports, including basketball, baseball, football and soccer. He graduated from Abraham Lincoln High School in Brooklyn in 2007.

He grew up watching Andrew Golota fights, which got him interested in boxing. As an overweight youngster who spoke English with a Polish accent, he was frequently the target of bullies at school and on the streets, which gave him further motivation to enter the boxing gym. Early in his boxing career, Kownacki had to work in construction and security in nightclubs to support himself.

Amateur career
Kownacki started training at Gleason's Gym at the age of 15. He first won the New York Golden Gloves heavyweight tournament in 2006 at the age of 17. He then went on to be the runner up in 2007 and 2008, then won the tournament for the second time in 2009.

Professional career

Early career 
Kownacki made his professional debut on 30 October 2009, at the PAL Gym in New York, United States, where he knocked out Carossee Auponte in the first round.
His first fight of 2010 was against Tyyab Beale, which he won by knockout in the second round. He went on to fight twice more in 2010, knocking out Yohan Banks and Damon Clement. 
He fought once in 2013, beating Calbert Lewis by knockout in the second round. Kownacki next fought on 29 March 2014, against Excell Holmes, who he knocked out in the second round. Kownacki went on to get knockout wins against Charles Ellis and Jamal Woods to finish off the year.

His first fight of 2015 was against Randy Easton, who he knocked out in the first round. His next fight took place on 29 May, where he beat Ytalo Perea by unanimous decision over 8 rounds, the first time he had gone the distance in his professional career. His next fight was against Maurenzo Smith on 1 August, at the Barclays Center, New York. He knocked Maurenzo out in the second round. His last fight of 2015 was a unanimous decision win over Rodney Hernandez. Kownacki fought twice in 2016, with a unanimous decision over Danny Kelly and a knockout win against Jesse Barboza. He then went on to face Joshua Tufte on 14 January 2017, who he knocked out in the second round.

Rise up the ranks 
On 15 July 2017 at the Nassau Coliseum in New York, he faced former world title challenger Artur Szpilka. Szpilka represented Kownacki's toughest opponent to date. He knocked out Szpilka in the 4th round.

Kownacki's first fight of 2018 was against Iago Kiladze, at the Barclays Center, New York, on the undercard of Errol Spence Jr. vs Lamont Peterson. He won the fight by knockout in the sixth round. On 8 September 2018 he faced former IBF heavyweight world champion Charles Martin. After a close ten round fight, Kownacki won by unanimous decision with all judges scoring the bout 96–94 in favor of Kownacki. The bout was a part of the undercard for Danny García vs Shawn Porter at the Barclays Center, New York.

On 26 January 2019 Kownacki faced Gerald Washington. Kownacki was ranked #5 by the IBF and #8 by the WBC. Kownacki knocked out Washington at the beginning of 2nd round.

In his second bout of 2019, on 3 August at the Barclays Center, New York, Kownacki defeated Chris Arreola by unanimous decision (118–110, 117–111, 117–111), winning the IBF Inter-Continental heavyweight title. The fight broke the CompuBox record for the most combined punches thrown (2,172) and landed (667) in a heavyweight fight.

Kownacki vs. Helenius 
On 7 March 2020, Kownacki faced Robert Helenius in a WBA title eliminator. Kownacki was ranked #3 by the IBF, #4 by the WBA and the WBO and #6 by the WBC, while Helenius was ranked #7 by the WBA.  While Kownacki was the heavy favorite, Helenius pulled off a significant upset by stopping Kownacki in the fourth round, handing him his first professional loss.

Kownacki vs. Helenius II 
After over a year out of the ring, Kownacki returned on 9 October 2021 on the undercard of Tyson Fury vs. Deontay Wilder III, against Robert Helenius in a rematch of their previous 2020 fight. The bout was stopped after six rounds of dominance by Helenius against a clearly overpowered Kownacki. The former had inflicted his opponent with a swollen left eye, before suffering repeated low blows, which caused Kownacki to be disqualified in the sixth round. After the bout, the result was later changed to a technical knockout victory for Helenius.

Professional boxing record

References

External links

Adam Kownacki - Profile, News Archive & Current Rankings at Box.Live

1989 births
Living people
Polish male boxers
Place of birth missing (living people)
People from Łomża
Heavyweight boxers
Polish emigrants to the United States